The Commission on Chicago Landmarks, established in 1968 by a Chicago City Ordinance, is composed of nine members appointed by the Mayor and the Chicago City Council. It is responsible for presenting recommendations of individual buildings, sites, objects, or entire districts to be designated as Chicago Landmarks, therefore providing legal protections. The commission is staffed by the Landmarks Division of the Chicago Department of Planning and Development.

Landmark requirements
To be recommended for landmark status, a building or district must meet at least two criteria: critical part of Chicago's heritage, site of a significant event, association with a significant person, important architecture, important architect, distinctive theme as a district, or unique visual feature. It must also retain a high degree of architectural integrity. The commission is responsible for reviewing proposed alteration, demolition or new construction affecting individual landmarks or properties in landmark districts as part of the permit review process.

In January 2005, 259 sites had achieved Chicago Landmark designation, including 217 individual designations, 38 landmark districts, and four district extensions, totalling 6,500 properties. 

Current appointed commission members include:
Rafael M. Leon, Chairman
Gabriel Ignacio Dziekiewicz
James M. Houlihan
Juan Gabriel Moreno
Carmen Rossi
Mary Ann Smith
Richard Tolliver
Ernest C. Wong
Ex-Officio:
David L. Reifman, DPD Commissioner

See also
Chicago Plan Commission
Landmarks Preservation Council of Illinois
List of Chicago Landmarks

References

External links
Chicago Landmarks Homepage

Government of Chicago